Benjamin Levi Madden (né Combs; born March 11, 1979) is an American musician. He is the lead guitarist and backing vocalist for the band Good Charlottefor which he has received various awardsas well as pop rock collaboration the Madden Brothers. He formed both of these acts with his identical twin brother, Joel Madden, with whom he was a coach on The Voice Australia from 2015–2016.

Early life 
Madden was born Benjamin Levi Combs on March 11, 1979, in Waldorf, Maryland, to Robin Madden and Roger Combs. He has an identical twin, Joel Madden, with whom he formed the band Good Charlotte. He has an older brother named Josh and a younger sister named Sarah. All attended La Plata High School in La Plata, Maryland.

Career 
In 1996 Madden started a band with his twin brother Joel named Good Charlotte.

While still playing in Good Charlotte, both Madden brothers wrote and produced for other artists. Madden was a co-writer and co-producer of some of the songs on Hilary Duff's Most Wanted (2005) compilation album. He later helped write the songs "Amnesia" for pop rockers 5 Seconds of Summer and "No Ordinary Girl" for pop artist Kalin and Myles. He has appeared as a back-up vocalist for artists such as MxPx, Kill Hannah, Apoptygma Berzerk, Mest, The 69 Eyes, Sean Kingston, Three 6 Mafia, Chamillionaire, and Matisyahu. As of September 2009 Madden has guest played in the band Taintstick, led by radio talk show host, professional MMA fighter, and pro skateboarder, Jason Ellis.

Madden started the fashion line called Made Clothing in 2001, along with his brothers Joel and Josh. In early 2006, it became DCMA Collective. A DCMA Collective store opened in Los Angeles on March 15, 2008, but later closed.

On April 3, 2010, Madden took part in a boxing match against MTV and VH1 host Riki Rachtman at Ellismania 5: Get These Brawls.  The event was hosted by Jason Ellis at The Joint in the Hard Rock Hotel and Casino in Las Vegas. Madden beat Rachtman by knockout at 1 minute and 42 seconds into the first round.

On November 11, 2011, Madden and his brother Joel Madden released a free mix-tape, "The Madden Brothers: Before Volume 1". It contains new artists the brothers were personally interested in. Their brother Josh Madden helped to produce the mix-tape. Then unknown rappers, Machine Gun Kelly, Rockie Fresh,  Kreayshawn, Cassie Veggies, HXLT, and Wiz Khalifa all appeared on the mix-tape.

In 2012, Benji appeared on the TV show The Voice Australia, alongside Joel as joint mentor-judges.

In early 2013, Benji helped write Tonight Alive's song "Breakdown". He sang back-up vocals at the end of the song and made an appearance in the video.

In 2014, electronic dance music artist TJR released his track "Come Back Down", which features Benji on the track's vocals. The Madden Brothers recording "Greetings from California" was released on September 16, 2014.

In mid-2014, both of the Madden brothers appeared as coaches on The Voice Kids Australia in a double chair, after the example of the Dutch The Voice of Holland and The Voice Kids Holland edition in which the singer's duo Nick & Simon appeared as a judging duo between 2010 and 2015. In early 2015, Benji joined Joel as a coach on the main edition of The Voice, bringing the number of coaches up to five.

In 2015 Madden and his two brothers formally started their company MDDN, of which Benji is CEO, offering artist management, artist development and creative services. The company gained success quickly with the brothers taking management of Jessie J, Sleeping with Sirens, Hollywood Undead, Waterparks, Anti-Flag, Chase Atlantic, K Camp, Architects and more.

Discography

With Good Charlotte

With The Madden Brothers 

 Before – Volume One (2011)
 Greetings from California (2014)

Vocal appearances

Filmography

Film

Television

Music videos 
 Rancid – "Fall Back Down"
 The White Tie Affair – "Candle (Sick and Tired)"
 Junior Sanchez – "Elevator"
 Young Dre The Truth – "Cheah Bah"
 Mest – "Jaded (These Years)"
 The 69 Eyes – "Dead N' Gone"
 Fenix Tx – "Threesome"
 Rad Omen – "Rad Anthem"
 Brand New – "Jude Law and a Semester Abroad"
 Escape the Fate – "10 Miles Wide"
 The Madden Brothers – "Oh My God"
 The Fray – "Love Don't Die"
 The Madden Brothers – "We Are Done"

Awards and nominations 

For his work as a guitarist for the alternative rock band Good Charlotte, he has received various accolades, including an MTV Video Music Award, a Nickelodeon Kids' Choice Award, and an NRJ Music Award.

Personal life 
In February 2008, Madden broke up with his long-time fiancée, Sophie Monk.

Madden began dating actress Cameron Diaz in May 2014. The two were unofficially engaged before Christmas Day in 2014 and were married on January 5, 2015, in a Jewish-inspired ceremony, at their Beverly Hills home. On December 30, 2019, they had a daughter via surrogate pregnancy. He has been very vocal about his hatred for spaghetti squash; “Literally so yucky. I gag”. 

Madden has many tattoos, including a tattoo of Benjamin Franklin, which covers his entire back.

References

External links 
 
 Good Charlotte official website
 Painted Flowers Official Site

1979 births
Living people
People from La Plata, Maryland
American punk rock guitarists
American rock guitarists
American male guitarists
Twin musicians
Identical twins
Guitarists from Maryland
American expatriates in Australia
VJs (media personalities)
Good Charlotte members
American twins
Lead guitarists